The European Athletic Association (more commonly known as European Athletics) is the governing body for athletics in Europe. It is one of the six Area Associations of the world's athletics governing body World Athletics. European Athletics has 51 members and is headquartered in Lausanne.

Originally created in 1932 as a European Committee, it was made into an independent body during the Bucharest conference of 1969. The first European Athletics congress took place in Paris on 6–8 October 1970, with Dutchman Adriaan Paulen elected as its first president. From a volunteer-led organization based in the acting Secretary's home country, European Athletics has developed into a professional organization with a permanent base in Switzerland.

European Athletics runs and regulates several championships and meetings across Europe – both indoor and outdoor.

History

After the foundation of the International Association of Athletic Federations (IAAF) in 1912, it was clear there needed to be a European committee as part of the governing board. While the idea originally met with some resistance, it was the active promotion by the Hungarian representative Szilard Stankovits that bought the initiative to life following the Los Angeles congress of the IAAF in 1932. Following this meeting, the Council officially designated a European Commission (chaired by Stankovits) with the task of reviewing the conditions for the organisation of the European Athletics Championships.

The first official meeting of what was later to be known as the European Commission was held in Budapest on 7 January 1934. The organization of the first European Athletics Championships was officially awarded to Turin. These first games were men-only and were notable by the absence of the British delegation, which opposed an event seen as competing with its own British Empire Games. The next championships took place in Paris in 1938, but after Stankovits' death the same year and the cancellation of all events during WWII, the Commission lay dormant until 1945.

During the post-war period, and with an increase in membership both at IAAF and European levels, the Commission quickly changed to an independent association, including the related financial and political independence from its international parent. Its budget, for example, increased from £100 in 1951 (for postal expenses) to US$40,000 per year in 1970. It was also during that period that the Commission started experimenting and developing a greater range of events besides the European Championships: the European Junior Championships (1964), the European Cup (1965), the Indoor championships (1966).

The Commission officially became a Committee in July 1952, gradually expanding its independence. The members of the Commission were elected at regular IAAF Congresses until 1966 when, for the first time, their selection became European-only. The shift also reflects the increased income received from television rights, as earnings took off as a direct result of broadcasting arrangements. The 1969 European championships secured a record US$90,000 from Eurovision for the rights to broadcast the event. It was then decided that the European Committee would directly receive these funds in order to benefit its members (rather than having it redistributed by the IAAF.)

On 31 October 1969, the Association of the European Members of the IAAF was constituted at a formal meeting of the European Committee of the IAAF in Bucharest. Its Constitutional Rules were ratified at the IAAF Congress in Stockholm, August 1970, and came into force at the first European Athletics Congress in Paris on 7 November 1970. Adriaan Paulen, who was president of the European Committee of the IAAF, was elected as the first President and simultaneously became (or remained) European representative on the IAAF Council. He held this position until his election as President of the IAAF in 1976.

The 1970s were also the time for European Athletics to raise the issue of doping. They started establishing more systematic controls, pushing for tests to be extended to non-European athletes as well. The European Championships of 1974 included a wider range of banned products than previously, with anabolic steroids being checked at all other subsequent events. As a continent, Europe clearly was "the nucleus of the IAAF" and an example to be followed for other IAAF members. As such, the European Association became an experimental platform for international athletics, organising events before they were recognized by the International Olympic Committee. For example, the women's marathon was included in the 1982 championships and became an Olympic distance for female athletes at the 1984 Summer Olympics.

The late 1980s saw major new challenges for sports in general, and European athletics in particular, with the increased professionalization of athletes and the breakdown of the Eastern Bloc. There was a huge increase in member federations (34 to 49 between 1987 and 1991) and the growing complexity of financial and commercial negotiations as well as an ever-expanding calendar of events meant that the organisation had to adapt. Till Luft, from Germany, became the first full-time General Secretary in 1995 and worked at the first European Athletics office in Frankfurt and, after April 1996, Darmstadt. A second office was also opened in London, next to the IAAF. A few years later, because of the somewhat unfavourable nature of the German tax system towards non-profit organizations, the proposal was made to merge both offices and move out of Germany. The move to Switzerland and necessary changes to Constitutional Rules were approved at the Athens Congress of 2003, and the new location opened in Lausanne (where several other sports organizations, including the IOC, were already located) on 1 January 2004.

Members and Governance
European Athletics' governance is split between five bodies: 
 The Congress, which is the general assembly of the Members and the supreme authority of the European Athletic Association;
 The Council, with the Executive Board and its President;
 The Commissions;
 The Head Office;
 The European Athletics Association Court.

Membership
European Athletics now has 51 members, with Kosovo having joined in 2015. Each member gets one vote at the Congress.

Since 2005, the European Athletic Association also has its own anthem, composed by the Armenian composer Gevorg Manasyan, which is used at the opening and closing of official events.

European Athletics Council

The European Athletics Council consists of:

 Members of the European Athletics Executive Board
Executive Board members 
Dobromir Karamarinov, President
 Cherry Alexander, Vice-President (GBR)
 Libor Varhaník, Vice-President (CZE)
 Karin Grute Movin (SWE)
 Christian Milz, CEO Director General (ex officio).

 Council members

The term of office for the Council is for the period from the effective date of its election to the conclusion of the next Ordinary Congress held in the year immediately preceding each Olympic Summer Games.

Competitions
There are four broad categories under which competitions are held:
 Senior : all athletes over 23 years old ;
 U23 : athletes aged from 20 to 22 years on 31 December of the year of the competition;
 U20 : athletes aged 16 to 19 years on 31 December of the year of the competition;
 U18 : athletes aged 16 to 17 years on 31 December of the year of the competition.

European Athletics organizes several official competitions at the European level,

Club competitions 
European Athletics also organises various club competitions, two track and field and one cross country.
 European Champion Clubs Cup (Senior)
 European Champion Clubs Cup (Junior)
 European Champion Clubs Cup Cross Country

Meetings
Any indoor or outdoor meeting within Europe, which invites international athletes and offers a prize money, appearance fee, and/or the value of non-cash prizes in excess of a certain amount is required to have a permit from European Athletic. The distinction between Premium, Classic and Special Premium meetings lies essentially in the number of mandatory events, level of attendance, stadium capacity, as well as commercial conditions and the number of doping controls. Classic Meeting requirements are less stringent than Premium, whereas Special Premium Meetings have a restricted programme of events (and therefore a reduced number of participating athletes).

Outdoor Permit Meetings
During the European Athletics Outdoor Season 2018 a total of 21 meetings — including Premium, Special Premium and Classic – are scheduled to be held:
Outdoor Premium Meetings
  Spitzen Leichtathletik Luzern, Lucerne
  Palio Città della Quercia, Rovereto

Outdoor Special Premium Meetings
  Street Pole Vault, Athens

Outdoor Classic Meetings

Outdoor Area Permit Meetings
Current or previous Outdoor Area Permit Meetings

Indoor Meetings
Current or previous Indoor Classic Permit Meetings:

  AIT International Grand Prix, Athlone
  Serbian Open, Belgrade
  All Star Perche, Clermont-Ferrand
  IFAM Meeting, Ghent
  Istanbul Athletics Cup
  Meeting Pas de Calais, Liévin
  Gugl Indoor Meeting, Linz
  Orlen Cup, Lodz
  Czech Indoor Gala, Ostrava
  Paris Indoor, Paris
  RIG Games, Reykjavik
  Combined Events Meeting, Tallinn
  Sparet Grand Prix, Stockholm

Cross Country Permit Meetings
During the European Athletics Cross Country season 2017–18 a total of 13 meetings are scheduled to be held:

Race Walking Permit Meetings

Sponsors
The European Athletic Association is the owner of all rights emanating from European athletics competitions and activities. Its current official sponsors are:
 SPAR
 Gruyère AOP
 Eurovision

See also

 European Athlete of the Year
 European Athlete of the Month
 List of European records in athletics

References

External links

Official website

 
Athletics organizations

Athletics
1969 establishments in Europe
Sports organizations established in 1969